XHFRE-FM is a radio station in Fresnillo, Zacatecas, Mexico. Broadcasting on 100.5 FM, XHFRE is owned by Grupo B15 and carries the national Exa FM format from MVS Radio.

History
The station's concession was awarded in 1993 to Jesús Antonio Bonilla Elizondo.

References

Radio stations in Zacatecas